Vefa High School, is one of the oldest and internationally renowned high school of Turkey. The first mülkiye lisesi (non-military high school) training in Turkish language was Vefa Lisesi (established in 1872) which forming and specializing as İdadi lessons and classes in Mekteb-i Mülkiye. Vefa S.K. was formed in this institution with initial players all being members of the school.  It is located in Vefa at Fatih, Istanbul.

History 
Education and instruction had been plough up thanks to old style institutions as mahalle mektebi, medrese before the modern age was arisen in the late of 18th century. The first modern education service in the Ottoman Empire run by military academic institutions. During the long transmission age of 19th century to modern times, dual system operated; a various of modern pattern education institutions like sıbyan mektepleri in primary education, rüşdiye (secondary school), idadi (high school), and sultani (high-college) were established and practised in different forming process. The first military high school: Kuleli Askeri İdadisi (1845), the first teacher training school: Darülmuallimin (1848; Instructor High School in Çapa), and the first high-college: Galatasaray Sultanisi (1868). Modern academic institutions like Mülkiye Mektebi (Administration), Hukuk Mektebi (Law), and Tıbbiye Mektebi (Medicine) were independent academic schools.
1868, modern education institutions which grown up inexperienced arranged in proper order by Maarif-i Umumiye Nizamnamesi, prepared in the period of Ahmet Cevdet Pahsa, Minister of Education. According to the Nizamname, modern education institutional structure was established on three stairs as primary, secondary (includes high school), and academy. Institutions for primary education: mahalle and sıbyan mektepleri; institution for academic education: Darülfünun. For the secondary educational step, there were three kinds of institution: Rüşdiye, İdadi, and Sultani. İdadi was known to be an exact equivalent previous model of contemporary high school. The first mülkiye lisesi (non-military high school) training in Turkish language was Vefa Lisesi (1872) which forming and specializing as İdadi lessons and classes in Mekteb-i Mülkiye.

İdadi - Sultani – High school
All of the classes of İdadi sections in the academic faculties (Mekteb-i Mülkiye, Mekteb-i Tıbbiye, Mekteb-i Hukuk) were become together as an independent high school, named as Dersaadet İdadi-i Mülk-i Şahanesi, in 1886. The high school was moved to Vefa when the building (now called Orta Bina that was built by Sadrazam Mütercim Rüştü Pahsa) was bought by the Ministry of Education from Gazi Ahmet Muhtar Pahsa, in 1884. Because of the new local in the district of Vefa, Vefa İdadi-i Mülki-i Şahanesi was given as a new name of the school in 1900.
The school was set on the status of sultani by name of Vefa Mekteb-i Sultanisi in the educating year of 1913-1914. In that season, the school became a permanent education institution in consist of primary, secondary, and high (all 12-year) classes. After the ratification of Tevhid-i Tedrisat Kanunu in 1924, all idadis and sultanis were called as Lise, so the new placard of the school was Vefa Erkek Lisesi. Then the school, just like some of high schools, was limited to secondary school service; and at the same time it was moved to the building of Pharmacy School in Kadırga.  The secondary school served by name of Vefa Orta Mektebi for eight years over there. In 1933, the school retransferred to its old location-historical building, and so it regained its previous post of Lise in Vefa, entitled as Vefa Erkek Lisesi, thanks to the initiative of over 300 people graduated, especially supports of Kemalettin Gedeleç, the Secretary of the President. The school contained both secondary and high classes till 1990, the year of transformation as Anatolian High School.

The first evening high school
The first evening high school in Istanbul was opened in 1958 within Vefa High School. Giving education by the name of Vefa Evening High School, it  had nearly 5000 graduates until 1978, in which it was transferred to Pertevniyal High School. There were several ministers, deputies, craftsmen, businessmen and scientists among these graduates.

Extra-curricular activities

Publications

Clubs 

 Basketball
 Chess
 Choir
 Theater
 Volleyball

Campus 
Vefa Anatolian High School provides training-education on an area in the district of Eminönü, quarter Şehzadebaşı, consisting of 4481 square metres. On 2000 square metres of this area, the school buildings are located, and 2500 square metres are garden. The school buildings consist of one boarding-house, the two other being training-educational buildings.

Main building 
In the new building of school, which is called the Main Building, the following are located: 
the directorate of the school, 
the administrative units, 
18 classrooms, 
3 scientific laboratories (physics, chemistry, biology), 
2 computer laboratories, 
1 measuring-evaluating center, 
guiding service (counselling commission), 
art workshop, 
school museum, 
archive, 
conference hall (has a capacity of 400 people), 
2 teachers' rooms, 
room for school's family union, 
room for social activities committee, 
the school canteen and tea cafe (Osman Amca's Place).

Middle building 
In the Mütercim Rüştü Paşa Mansion of the school, which is called the Middle Building, there are:
8 classrooms, 
musical teaching room, 
cine-vision hall (has a capacity of 70 people), 
library (has a capacity of 50 people), 
1 room for vice-director, 
guiding service (counselling commission), 
a room for The Head of Foreign Languages Department, 
the course center.

Boarding-house 
In the boarding-house, there is a refectory in the basement floor for 250 people, in the 1st floor there are warehouses, in the 2nd and 3rd floors 10 dormitories, 1 television room and rooms for other teaching personal. The boarding-house has a capacity of 90 students.

Vefa sports

References and notes 

 
1872 establishments in the Ottoman Empire